Paraburdoo is a mining town in the Pilbara region of Western Australia.

Etymology
The name of the town comes from an Aboriginal word said to mean "feathered meat", which could refer to abundant Little corella or flock pigeons. It could also mean Rock Cave (para means rock and buradoo means hole or cave) to refer to caves nearby.

Economy
Paraburdoo was developed in the early 1970s to support Hamersley Iron's (now Pilbara Iron) local iron ore mining operations, and was gazetted as a town in 1972.

The town provides housing to workers of the three nearby Rio Tinto mines, those being the Channar, Eastern Range and Paraburdoo mine.

Geography

Facilities
Most of the town's residents are employed by Pilbara Iron's mining operation and the supporting services. Facilities available for families include daycare, a primary school, and a TAFE. There are also skate parks, swimming pools, tennis courts, and netball, cricket and football fields. Paraburdoo has its own shopping facilities and medical centres.

Climate
Paraburdoo has a hot desert climate (Köppen climate classification BWh). In summer, the days are very hot and the nights are warm. There is an average of 72.2 days per year where the temperature rises above . In winter, the days are warm and the nights are cool. Precipitation is highly variable, coming from storms and tropical cyclones. It falls most often between December and March. Rainfall is sparse from July to November.

See also
 Pilbara historical timeline
 Pilbara newspapers
 Red Dog Story

References

External links
Rio Tinto Iron Ore website

Mining towns in Western Australia
Shire of Ashburton